Union Township is one of eleven townships in Montgomery County, Indiana, United States. As of the 2010 census, its population was 24,587 and it contained 10,723 housing units.  Wabash College is located in Crawfordsville in this township.

Geography

Cities, towns, villages
 Crawfordsville
 New Market (north half)

Unincorporated towns
 Ames at 
 Fiskville at 
 Garfield at 
 Lake Holiday
 Manchester at 
 North Union at 
 Smartsburg at 
 Whitesville at 
(This list is based on USGS data and may include former settlements.)

Cemeteries
The township contains these nineteen cemeteries: Ben Hur, Breaks, Calvary, Coons, Finley Chapel, Galey, Harshbarger, Hutton, Independent Order of Odd Fellows, Lutheran, Michael, Nutt, Oak Hill, Oldtown, Sidener, Stover, Weir, Wilhite and Wilson.

Major highways
  Interstate 74
  U.S. Route 136
  U.S. Route 231
  Indiana State Road 32
  Indiana State Road 47

Airports and landing strips
 Crawfordsville Municipal Airport

School districts
 Crawfordsville Community Schools
 North Montgomery Community School Corporation
 South Montgomery Community School Corporation

Political districts
 Indiana's 4th congressional district
 State House District 41
 State Senate District 23

References
 
 United States Census Bureau 2008 TIGER/Line Shapefiles
 IndianaMap

External links
 Indiana Township Association
 United Township Association of Indiana
 City-Data.com page for Union Township

Townships in Montgomery County, Indiana
Townships in Indiana